George Grenfell Glyn, 2nd Baron Wolverton PC (10 February 1824 – 6 November 1887), was a British Liberal politician. He held office in three of the Liberal administrations of William Gladstone.

Background
Wolverton was the eldest of the nine sons of the banker George Glyn, 1st Baron Wolverton, and his wife Marianne, daughter of Pascoe Grenfell. His grandfather Sir Richard Carr Glyn, 1st Baronet, of Gaunt's House, and great-grandfather Sir Richard Glyn, 1st Baronet, of Ewell, had been prominent London bankers, both had served as Lord Mayor of London.

Political career
Wolverton was elected to Parliament for Shaftesbury as a Liberal in 1857, a seat he would hold until he succeeded his father in 1873 and entered the House of Lords. In 1868 he was appointed Parliamentary Secretary to the Treasury in William Gladstone's first administration, a post he held until 1873, when he was also admitted to the Privy Council. The Liberals lost office in 1874, but when Gladstone returned to power in 1880 Wolverton was appointed Paymaster-General. He retained this office until Gladstone resigned in June 1885 and the Conservatives came to power under Lord Salisbury.

The same year the Liberal Party split over the issue of Irish Home Rule. Wolverton supported Gladstone and was rewarded when he was made Postmaster General in February 1886, when Gladstone became Prime Minister for a third time. However, the government fell already in July the same year.

Iwerne Minster
In 1876 he bought the manorial estate at Iwerne Minster in Dorset from the Bower family, to which he made many changes and improvements, including the building of a large mansion designed by Alfred Waterhouse. Much of the farmland was turned over to parkland, and he pursued his passion for hunting, maintaining, till 1879, a pack of bloodhounds.

Family

Lord Wolverton married Georgiana Maria Tufnell, daughter of Reverend George Tufnell, in 1848. They had no children. He died suddenly in November 1887, aged 63, and was succeeded in the barony by his nephew, Henry Glyn.

They lived at Warren House in Coombe, Kingston upon Thames. The small country house, now a Grade II listed conference centre, was built in the 1860s for Hugh Hammersley, and then extended 1884-6 by the architect George Devey.

References

External links 
 

1824 births
1887 deaths
Barons in the Peerage of the United Kingdom
Glyn, George Grenfell
Members of the Privy Council of the United Kingdom
Glyn, George Grenfell
Glyn, George Grenfell
Glyn, George Grenfell
Glyn, George Grenfell
UK MPs who inherited peerages
George
Eldest sons of British hereditary barons